Taraxacum aphrogenes, the Paphos dandelion, is a perennial, lactiferous, rosulate, hairless herb, up to 12 cm high. Leaves all in rosette, simple, divided almost to midrib, into unequal, bluntish, suborbicular lobes, fleshy, oblong, 3-8 x 0.3-2 cm. Flowers in capitula, with yellow, ligulate florets. Flowers October–December in advance of the leaves. Fruit a pappose achene.

Habitat 
Rock and sandy soils by the coastline.

Distribution 
Endemic to Cyprus, it is restricted to the Paphos District where it is locally common, especially at Akamas from Ayios Yeorgios Peyias to Karavopetres: Erimites. Also at Kato Paphos, Yeroskipou and Petra tou Romiou.

References

External links
 http://wildlifetravelling.blogspot.no/2012/11/cyprus-19th-november-2012.html
 http://forum.plantarium.ru/viewtopic.php?id=24942
 http://gardenbreizh.org/photos/karlostachys/photo-312911.html
 http://www.planetefleurs.fr/Systematique/Asteraceae/Taraxacum_aphrogenes.htm
 http://www.bium.univ-paris5.fr/sbf/chypre/pt/056.jpg

aphrogenes
Endemic flora of Cyprus
Taxa named by Robert Desmond Meikle
Plants described in 1983